Heather Angela Ballara (née Devitt; 16 August 1944 – 17 September 2021) was a New Zealand historian who specialised in Māori history. She was appointed a member of the Waitangi Tribunal in 2004. After a short break, she was reappointed to the role in 2015.

She was born on 16 August 1944, and studied at the University of Auckland, graduating with a Bachelor of Arts in history in 1969, and a Master of Arts in history in 1973. Her master's thesis had the title Warfare and government in Ngapuhi tribal society, 1814–1833 : institutions of authority and the function of warfare in the period of early settlement, 1814–1833, in the Bay of Islands and related territories. She later completed a PhD at Victoria University of Wellington in 1991 on the origins of Ngāti Kahungunu. An authority on Māori customary history, Ballara was the editorial officer (Māori) for the Dictionary of New Zealand Biography for 15 years.

Ballara died in Wellington on 17 September 2021, aged 77.

Selected publications

References

1944 births
2021 deaths
University of Auckland alumni
Victoria University of Wellington alumni
20th-century New Zealand historians
New Zealand biographers
Members of the Waitangi Tribunal
21st-century New Zealand historians
New Zealand women historians